Events in the year 1898 in Brazil.

Incumbents

Federal government
President: Prudente de Morais (until 14 November), Manuel Ferraz de Campos Sales (starting 15 November)
Vice-President: Manuel Vitorino, (until 14 November), Francisco de Assis Rosa e Silva (starting 15 November)

Governors 
 Alagoas: Manuel Jose Duarte
 Amazonas: Fileto Pires Ferreira (until 4 April), José Cardoso Ramalho Júnior (starting 4 April)
 Bahia: Luís Viana
 Ceará: Antônio Nogueira Accioli
 Goiás:
 until July 9: Francisco Leopoldo Rodrigues Jardim
 July 9 - November 1: Bernardo Albernaz
 from November 1: Urbano Coelho de Gouveia
 Maranhão:
 until 1 March: Alfredo Martins
 1 March - 11 August: José de Magalhães Braga
 from 11 August: João Gualberto Torreão da Costa
 Mato Grosso: Manuel José Murtinho, then Antônio Correia da Costa
 Minas Gerais: 
 until 7 September: Bias Fortes
 from 7 September: Silviano Brandão
 Pará: Pais de Carvalho
 Paraíba: Antônio Alfredo Mello
 Paraná: Santos Andrade
 Pernambuco: Joaquim Correia de Araújo
 Piauí: Raimundo Artur de Vasconcelos
 Rio Grande do Norte: Joaquim Ferreira Chaves
 Rio Grande do Sul: 
 until 25 January: Júlio Prates de Castilhos
 from 25 January: Antônio Augusto Borges de Medeiros
 Santa Catarina:
 São Paulo: 
 Sergipe:

Vice governors 
 Rio Grande do Norte:
 São Paulo:

Events
1 March - In the presidential election, Manuel Ferraz de Campos Sales of the Republican Party of São Paulo, is successful, with 90.9% of the vote, replacing incumbent president Prudente de Morais who, because of ill-health, had already delegated most of his presidential duties to Vice President Manuel Vitorino.

Births
14 January - Juarez Távora
14 February - Angela Bambace, labor union organizer (died 1975)
6 March - Eugênia Álvaro Moreyra, journalist, actress and theater director (died 1948)
4 October - João Fahrion, painter, engraver, draughtsman and illustrator (died 1970) 
28 November - Tyrteu Rocha Vianna, avant-garde poet (died 1963)
30 December - Luís da Câmara Cascudo, anthropologist, folklorist, journalist, historian, lawyer, and lexicographer (died 1986)

Deaths
27 March - Princess Francisca of Brazil, the Princess of Joinville, daughter of Emperor Dom Pedro I of Brazil (born 1824)
9 April - André Rebouças, military engineer, abolitionist and inventor (born 1838)

References

 
1890s in Brazil
Years of the 19th century in Brazil
Brazil
Brazil